Leptonectidae is a family of ichthyosaurs known from Late Triassic to Early Jurassic marine deposits in Europe. They were all small to medium-sized creatures, most noted for their very long, swordfish-like snouts, which could have been used like a weapon, slashing through schools of fish.

References

Late Triassic ichthyosaurs
Late Triassic first appearances
Early Jurassic extinctions
Prehistoric reptile families